The 2003 Croatian Bol Ladies Open was a women's tennis tournament played on outdoor clay courts in Bol, Croatia and was part of the Tier III category of the 2003 WTA Tour. It was the tenth edition of the tournament and was held from 28 April until 4 May 2003. Third-seeded Vera Zvonareva won the singles title and earned $27,000 first-prize money.

Finals

Singles

 Vera Zvonareva defeated  Conchita Martínez Granados 6–1, 6–3
 It was Zvonareva's first singles title of her career.

Doubles

 Petra Mandula /  Patricia Wartusch defeated  Emmanuelle Gagliardi /  Patty Schnyder 6–3, 6–2

External links
 ITF tournament edition details
 Tournament draws

Croatian Bol Ladies Open
Croatian Bol Ladies Open
2003 in Croatian tennis
2003 in Croatian women's sport